Three Handy-class destroyers served with the Royal Navy.

Design and construction
Of the 36 destroyers, three ships (Handy, Hart and Hunter) were ordered from Fairfield Shipbuilding and Engineering Company of Govan, the first torpedo craft to be built by that shipyard. As typical for torpedo craft at the time, the Admiralty left detailed design to the builders, laying down only broad requirements.

Displacement was  light and  full load, while the ship's complement was 53 officers and men. Two funnels were fitted. Armament consisted of a single QF 12 pounder 12 cwt gun and three 6-pounder guns, with two 18 inch (450 mm) torpedo tubes. As a gunboat, one of the torpedo tubes could be removed to accommodate a further two six-pounders.

In September 1913 the Admiralty re-classed all the surviving 27-knotter destroyers as A Class, although this only applied to Handy herself as the other two ships had already been sold for scrap in 1912.

See also
A-class destroyer (1913)

References

Notes

Citations

Bibliography

 

 

Destroyer classes
 
Ship classes of the Royal Navy